St. Thomas Hospital may refer to:

St Thomas' Hospital, in London, England
Saint Thomas Health, an integrated health delivery system based in Nashville, Tennessee, U.S.
Saint Thomas - Rutherford Hospital, formerly Middle Tennessee Medical Center
Saint Thomas - West Hospital, formerly Saint Thomas Hospital
Saint Thomas Hickman Hospital
Saint Thomas - Midtown Hospital
St Thomas Hospital (Kerala), in Kattimoola, Kerala, India
Hospital of St Thomas of Canterbury, a house of Augustinian canons in medieval Birmingham, England
Summa St. Thomas Hospital, in Akron, Ohio
Hospital Santo Tomás, in Panama City,